The 2008 Louisiana–Lafayette Ragin' Cajuns football team represented the University of Louisiana at Lafayette in the 2008 NCAA Division I FBS football season. Louisiana–Lafayette competed as a member of the Sun Belt Conference, and played their home games at Cajun Field. The Ragin' Cajuns were led by seventh-year head coach Rickey Bustle. UL-Lafayette finished the season with a 6–6 record (Sun Belt: 5–2).

Louisiana–Lafayette came close to an upset against 24th-ranked Illinois at home but ultimately lost, 20–17. The Ragin' Cajuns were also competitive against Kansas State, trailing by 42–37 late in that game, but Louisiana-Lafayette was hindered by ten penalties, twice as many as called against their opponent. Louisiana-Lafayette beat Arkansas State with a touchdown in the last 0:42 to play and won, 28–23. They defeated Florida International decisively, 49–20, before losing to UTEP in Lafayette.  lost to Florida Atlantic after trailing, 40–7, in the final quarter. The following week, they were routed by eventual Sun Belt champions Troy, 48–3. UL-Lafayette won their finale against Middle Tennessee, 42–28, which gave the Cajuns their sixth win, and with it, bowl eligibility. The Ragin' Cajuns also finished second in the Sun Belt Conference with a 5–2 mark in league play. It was the third season in four years that the Cajuns became bowl eligible, but the Cajuns did not receive a bowl bid.

Preseason

Award Watchlist

Sun Belt Media Day

Preseason Standings

Preseason All-Conference Team

Offense
RB Tyrell Fenroy
OL Chris Fisher

Special Teams
PK Drew Edmiston

Roster

Schedule

Game summaries

@ Southern Miss

@ Illinois

Kent State

@ Kansas State

@ Louisiana-Monroe

@ North Texas

Arkansas State

FIU

UTEP

@ Florida Atlantic

@ Troy

Middle Tennessee

Postseason

All–Conference Team 

First-Team Offense
QB Michael Desormeaux
RB Tyrell Fenroy
OL Brad Bustle
OL Chris Fisher

Second-Team Offense
WR Jason Chery

Second-Team Defense
DB Derik Keyes

Second-Team Special Teams
RS Jason Cherry

Honorable Mentions
OL Jonathan Decoster
LB Antwyne Zanders

Post-Season Awards 
 Tyrell Fenroy, ULL - Player of the Year
 Michael Desormeaux, ULL - Offensive Player of the Year
 Alex Carrington, ASU - Defensive Player of the Year
 Levi Brown, TROY - Newcomer of the Year
 T. Y. Hilton, FIU - Freshman of the Year
 Larry Blakeney, TROY - Coach of the Year

References

Louisiana-Lafayette
Louisiana Ragin' Cajuns football seasons
Louisiana-Lafayette Ragin' Cajuns football